Delaf (the pen name of Marc Delafontaine, born October 9, 1973, in Sherbrooke, Quebec), is a Québécois comics creator and illustrator, notable for his work in The Bellybuttons (Les Nombrils), a comics feature that he co-created with his wife, Maryse Dubuc.

Biography
Delaf began his career as an illustrator of a series of brochures advertising for a school that specialised in the education of French as a second language. He would soon expand his career, working in animation, illustrating children's books, and drawing and writing comics.

In 2004, Delaf and Dubuc would co-create Les Nombrils, a comic strip that focuses on the social life of three teenage girls, for the Québécois humour magazine, Safarir. The following year, Spirou, a Franco-Belgian comics magazine, would pick up the strip, which they carried ever since.

Bibliography

Comics series
 The Bellybuttons (Les Nombrils), written and coloured by Dubuc (2004–present)

Contributions
 Le Guide junior pour bien élever ses parents, Goupil & Douyé & Dubuc, Éditions Vents d'Ouest, Collection Le guide junior (March 2005)

External links
 Dupuis: Author page for Delaf 

1973 births
Artists from Quebec
Canadian comics artists
Living people
Canadian comics writers
Quebec comics
Pseudonymous writers
Writers from Sherbrooke
Romance comics artists